Catton is a village and civil parish in the Hambleton District of North Yorkshire, England.  It is situated between Thirsk and Ripon, on the River Swale.

References

External links

Villages in North Yorkshire
Civil parishes in North Yorkshire
Hambleton District